Cross Bones is the eighth novel by Kathy Reichs starring forensic anthropologist, Temperance Brennan.

Plot
The story begins in Montreal, Canada, with the body of Avram Faris, who is an antiques dealer and an orthodox Jew. Brennan continues the investigation in Israel, where she and sometime lover Detective Andrew Ryan, and her friend, archeologist Jake Drum, are threatened by radical orthodox sects and other, unknown, parties.

Facts behind the book 
Reichs explains the C14 dating of remains as well as ground-penetrating radar in this book.

The protagonist Jake Drum is modeled after Reich's colleague and Biblical archaeologist James Tabor; in the afterword explaining the facts behind the book, she recommends his book The Jesus Dynasty as enjoyable reading. Neither she nor her protagonists in the novel verify or falsify the existence of a tomb of the Jesus family discovered by Shimon Gibson (cf. controversy regarding the Talpiot Tomb and James Ossuary), leaving it as a question of the personal faith of everyone.

The book builds on Jewish and ancient Christian history like the Masada.

External links
 Kathy Reichs' page on Cross Bones

Novels by Kathy Reichs
2005 American novels
American crime novels

Novels set in Montreal
Novels set in Israel